Peter Desmond (23 November 1926 in Cork, Ireland – July 1990) was an Irish footballer. Desmond played for several clubs in the League of Ireland and the English League. As an international, Desmond also played for Ireland.

Desmond made all four appearances for Ireland while playing for Middlesbrough. He made his international debut in a 3–0 win against Finland on 8 September 1949 at Dalymount Park in a World Cup qualifier.

Desmond was also a member of the Ireland team that defeated England 2–0 at Goodison Park, becoming the first non-UK team to beat England at home. Ireland took the lead in the 33rd minute when   Desmond, after collecting a pass from Tommy O'Connor, was brought down in the England penalty area; Con Martin then converted the subsequent penalty kick.

Desmond made just two more international appearances for Ireland. They came on 9 October 1949 in a 1–1 draw with Finland and on 13 November 1949 in 3–1 defeat to Sweden. Both these games were World Cup qualifiers.

Sources
The Boys In Green - The FAI International Story (1997): Sean Ryan

External links
 Ireland Stats
    Cork City fansite
Harlepool United fansite

1926 births
1990 deaths
Association footballers from Cork (city)
Republic of Ireland association footballers
Ireland (FAI) international footballers
Shelbourne F.C. players
Waterford F.C. players
Middlesbrough F.C. players
York City F.C. players
Hartlepool United F.C. players
Stockton F.C. players
League of Ireland players
Association football forwards